This is a list of the bird species recorded in Angola. The avifauna of Angola include a total of 1005 species, of which thirteen are endemic, and one has been introduced by humans.

This list's taxonomic treatment (designation and sequence of orders, families and species) and nomenclature (common and scientific names) follow the conventions of The Clements Checklist of Birds of the World, 2022 edition. The family accounts at the beginning of each heading reflect this taxonomy, as do the species counts found in each family account. Introduced and accidental species are included in the total counts for Angola.

The following tags have been used to highlight several categories. The commonly occurring native species do not fall into any of these categories.

 (A) Accidental - a species that rarely or accidentally occurs in Angola
 (E) Endemic - a species endemic to Angola
 (I) Introduced - a species introduced to Angola as a consequence, direct or indirect, of human actions

Ostriches
Order: StruthioniformesFamily: Struthionidae

The ostrich is a flightless bird native to Africa. It is the largest living species of bird. It is distinctive in its appearance, with a long neck and legs and the ability to run at high speeds.

Common ostrich, Struthio camelus

Ducks, geese, and waterfowl
Order: AnseriformesFamily: Anatidae

Anatidae includes the ducks and most duck-like waterfowl, such as geese and swans. These birds are adapted to an aquatic existence with webbed feet, flattened bills, and feathers that are excellent at shedding water due to an oily coating.

White-faced whistling-duck, Dendrocygna viduata
Fulvous whistling-duck, Dendrocygna bicolor
White-backed duck, Thalassornis leuconotus
Knob-billed duck, Sarkidiornis melanotos
Hartlaub's duck, Pteronetta hartlaubii
Egyptian goose, Alopochen aegyptiacus
Spur-winged goose, Plectropterus gambensis
African pygmy-goose, Nettapus auritus
Blue-billed teal, Spatula hottentota
Cape shoveler, Spatula smithii (A)
Northern shoveler, Spatula clypeata
African black duck, Anas sparsa
Yellow-billed duck, Anas undulata
Cape teal, Anas capensis
Red-billed duck, Anas erythrorhyncha
Southern pochard, Netta erythrophthalma
Maccoa duck, Oxyura maccoa (A)

Guineafowl
Order: GalliformesFamily: Numididae

Guineafowl are a group of African, seed-eating, ground-nesting birds that resemble partridges, but with featherless heads and spangled grey plumage.

Helmeted guineafowl, Numida meleagris
Black guineafowl, Agelastes niger
Plumed guineafowl, Guttera plumifera
Western crested guineafowl, Guttera verreauxi

Pheasants, grouse, and allies
Order: GalliformesFamily: Phasianidae

The Phasianidae are a family of terrestrial birds which consists of quails, partridges, snowcocks, francolins, spurfowls, tragopans, monals, pheasants, peafowls and jungle fowls. In general, they are plump (although they vary in size) and have broad, relatively short wings.

Latham's francolin, Peliperdix lathami
Crested francolin, Ortygornis sephaena
Coqui francolin, Campocolinus coqui
White-throated francolin, Campocolinus albogularis
Red-winged francolin, Scleroptila levaillantii
Finsch's francolin, Scleroptila finschi
Orange River francolin, Scleroptila gutturalis
Blue quail, Synoicus adansonii
Common quail, Coturnix coturnix
Harlequin quail, Coturnix delegorguei
Hartlaub's francolin, Pternistis hartlaubi
Swierstra's francolin, Pternistis swierstrai (E)
Gray-striped francolin, Pternistis griseostriatus (E)
Red-billed francolin, Pternistis adspersus
Scaly francolin, Pternistis squamatus
Swainson's francolin, Pternistis swainsonii
Red-necked francolin, Pternistis afer

Flamingos
Order: PhoenicopteriformesFamily: Phoenicopteridae

Flamingos are gregarious wading birds, usually 1–1.5 m tall, found in both the Western and Eastern Hemispheres. Flamingos filter-feed on shellfish and algae. Their oddly shaped beaks are specially adapted to separate mud and silt from the food they consume and, uniquely, are used upside-down.

Greater flamingo, Phoenicopterus roseus
Lesser flamingo, Phoenicopterus minor

Grebes
Order: PodicipediformesFamily: Podicipedidae

Grebes are small to medium-large freshwater diving birds. They have lobed toes and are excellent swimmers and divers. However, they have their feet placed far back on the body, making them quite ungainly on land.

Little grebe, Tachybaptus ruficollis
Great crested grebe, Podiceps cristatus
Eared grebe, Podiceps nigricollis (A)

Pigeons and doves
Order: ColumbiformesFamily: Columbidae

Pigeons and doves are stout-bodied birds with short necks and short slender bills with a fleshy cere.

Rock pigeon, Columba livia (I)
Speckled pigeon, Columba guinea
Afep pigeon, Columba unicincta
Rameron pigeon, Columba arquatrix
Bronze-naped pigeon, Columba iriditorques
Lemon dove, Columba larvata (A)
Mourning collared-dove, Streptopelia decipiens
Red-eyed dove, Streptopelia semitorquata
Ring-necked dove, Streptopelia capicola
Laughing dove, Streptopelia senegalensis
Emerald-spotted wood-dove, Turtur chalcospilos
Blue-spotted wood-dove, Turtur afer
Tambourine dove, Turtur tympanistria
Blue-headed wood-dove, Turtur brehmeri
Namaqua dove, Oena capensis
African green-pigeon, Treron calva

Sandgrouse
Order: PterocliformesFamily: Pteroclidae

Sandgrouse have small, pigeon like heads and necks, but sturdy compact bodies. They have long pointed wings and sometimes tails and a fast direct flight. Flocks fly to watering holes at dawn and dusk. Their legs are feathered down to the toes.

Namaqua sandgrouse, Pterocles namaqua
Yellow-throated sandgrouse, Pterocles gutturalis
Double-banded sandgrouse, Pterocles bicinctus
Burchell's sandgrouse, Pterocles burchelli

Bustards
Order: OtidiformesFamily: Otididae

Bustards are large terrestrial birds mainly associated with dry open country and steppes in the Old World. They are omnivorous and nest on the ground. They walk steadily on strong legs and big toes, pecking for food as they go. They have long broad wings with "fingered" wingtips and striking patterns in flight. Many have interesting mating displays.

Kori bustard, Ardeotis kori
Ludwig's bustard, Neotis ludwigii
Denham's bustard, Neotis denhami
White-bellied bustard, Eupodotis senegalensis
Rüppell's bustard, Eupodotis rueppellii
Red-crested bustard, Lophotis ruficrista
White-quilled bustard, Eupodotis afraoides
Black-bellied bustard, Lissotis melanogaster

Turacos
Order: MusophagiformesFamily: Musophagidae

The turacos, plantain eaters and go-away-birds make up the bird family Musophagidae. They are medium-sized arboreal birds. The turacos and plantain eaters are brightly coloured, usually in blue, green or purple. The go-away birds are mostly grey and white.

Great blue turaco, Corythaeola cristata
Guinea turaco, Tauraco persa
Schalow's turaco, Tauraco schalowi
Black-billed turaco, Tauraco schuettii
Yellow-billed turaco, Tauraco macrorhynchus
Red-crested turaco, Tauraco erythrolophus (E)
Ross's turaco, Musophaga rossae
Gray go-away-bird, Corythaixoides concolor

Cuckoos
Order: CuculiformesFamily: Cuculidae

The family Cuculidae includes cuckoos, roadrunners and anis. These birds are of variable size with slender bodies, long tails and strong legs.

Gabon coucal, Centropus anselli
Senegal coucal, Centropus senegalensis
Blue-headed coucal, Centropus monachus
Coppery-tailed coucal, Centropus cupreicaudus
White-browed coucal, Centropus superciliosus
Black coucal, Centropus grillii
Blue malkoha, Ceuthmochares aereus
Great spotted cuckoo, Clamator glandarius
Levaillant's cuckoo, Clamator levaillantii
Pied cuckoo, Clamator jacobinus
Thick-billed cuckoo, Pachycoccyx audeberti
Dideric cuckoo, Chrysococcyx caprius
Klaas's cuckoo, Chrysococcyx klaas
Yellow-throated cuckoo, Chrysococcyx flavigularis (A)
African emerald cuckoo, Chrysococcyx cupreus
Dusky long-tailed cuckoo, Cercococcyx mechowi
Olive long-tailed cuckoo, Cercococcyx olivinus
Black cuckoo, Cuculus clamosus
Red-chested cuckoo, Cuculus solitarius
African cuckoo, Cuculus gularis
Common cuckoo, Cuculus canorus

Nightjars and allies
Order: CaprimulgiformesFamily: Caprimulgidae

Nightjars are medium-sized nocturnal birds that usually nest on the ground. They have long wings, short legs and very short bills. Most have small feet, of little use for walking, and long pointed wings. Their soft plumage is camouflaged to resemble bark or leaves.

Pennant-winged nightjar, Caprimulgus vexillarius
Eurasian nightjar, Caprimulgus europaeus
Rufous-cheeked nightjar, Caprimulgus rufigena
Fiery-necked nightjar, Caprimulgus pectoralis
Montane nightjar, Caprimulgus poliocephalus
Swamp nightjar, Caprimulgus natalensis
Freckled nightjar, Caprimulgus tristigma
Long-tailed nightjar, Caprimulgus climacurus
Square-tailed nightjar, Caprimulgus fossii

Swifts
Order: CaprimulgiformesFamily: Apodidae

Swifts are small birds which spend the majority of their lives flying. These birds have very short legs and never settle voluntarily on the ground, perching instead only on vertical surfaces. Many swifts have long swept-back wings which resemble a crescent or boomerang.

Mottled spinetail, Telacanthura ussheri
Black spinetail, Telacanthura melanopygia (A)
Sabine's spinetail, Rhaphidura sabini
Cassin's spinetail, Neafrapus cassini
Bat-like spinetail, Neafrapus boehmi
Scarce swift, Schoutedenapus myoptilus
Alpine swift, Apus melba
Mottled swift, Apus aequatorialis
Common swift, Apus apus
Pallid swift, Apus pallidus
African swift, Apus barbatus (A)
Bradfield's swift, Apus bradfieldi
Little swift, Apus affinis
Horus swift, Apus horus
White-rumped swift, Apus caffer
African palm-swift, Cypsiurus parvus

Flufftails
Order: GruiformesFamily: Sarothruridae

The flufftails are a small family of ground-dwelling birds found only in Madagascar and sub-Saharan Africa.

White-spotted flufftail, Sarothrura pulchra
Buff-spotted flufftail, Sarothrura elegans
Red-chested flufftail, Sarothrura rufa
Chestnut-headed flufftail, Sarothrura lugens
Streaky-breasted flufftail, Sarothrura boehmi
Striped flufftail, Sarothrura affinis

Rails, gallinules, and coots
Order: GruiformesFamily: Rallidae

Rallidae is a large family of small to medium-sized birds which includes the rails, crakes, coots and gallinules. Typically they inhabit dense vegetation in damp environments near lakes, swamps or rivers. In general they are shy and secretive birds, making them difficult to observe. Most species have strong legs and long toes which are well adapted to soft uneven surfaces. They tend to have short, rounded wings and to be weak fliers.

African rail, Rallus caerulescens
Corn crake, Crex crex (A)
African crake, Crex egregia
Spotted crake, Porzana porzana
Lesser moorhen, Paragallinula angulata
Eurasian moorhen, Gallinula chloropus
Red-knobbed coot, Fulica cristata
Allen's gallinule, Porphyrio alleni
African swamphen, Porphyrio madagascariensis
Nkulengu rail, Himantornis haematopus
Striped crake, Amaurornis marginalis
Black crake, Zapornia flavirostris
Baillon's crake, Zapornia pusilla

Finfoots
Order: GruiformesFamily: Heliornithidae

Heliornithidae is a small family of tropical birds with webbed lobes on their feet similar to those of grebes and coots.

African finfoot, Podica senegalensis

Cranes
Order: GruiformesFamily: Gruidae

Cranes are large, long-legged and long-necked birds. Unlike the similar-looking but unrelated herons, cranes fly with necks outstretched, not pulled back. Most have elaborate and noisy courting displays or "dances".

Gray crowned-crane, Balearica regulorum
Black crowned-crane, Balearica pavonina
Wattled crane, Bugeranus carunculatus

Thick-knees
Order: CharadriiformesFamily: Burhinidae

The thick-knees are a group of largely tropical waders in the family Burhinidae. They are found worldwide within the tropical zone, with some species also breeding in temperate Europe and Australia. They are medium to large waders with strong black or yellow-black bills, large yellow eyes and cryptic plumage. Despite being classed as waders, most species have a preference for arid or semi-arid habitats.

Water thick-knee, Burhinus vermiculatus
Spotted thick-knee, Burhinus capensis

Egyptian plover
Order: CharadriiformesFamily: Pluvianidae

The Egyptian plover is found across equatorial Africa and along the Nile River.

Egyptian plover, Pluvianus aegyptius

Stilts and avocets
Order: CharadriiformesFamily: Recurvirostridae

Recurvirostridae is a family of large wading birds, which includes the avocets and stilts. The avocets have long legs and long up-curved bills. The stilts have extremely long legs and long, thin, straight bills. There are 9 species worldwide and 2 species which occur in Angola.

Black-winged stilt, Himantopus himantopus
Pied avocet, Recurvirostra avosetta

Oystercatchers
Order: CharadriiformesFamily: Haematopodidae

The oystercatchers are large and noisy plover-like birds, with strong bills used for smashing or prising open molluscs.

Eurasian oystercatcher, Haematopus ostralegus
African oystercatcher, Haematopus moquini

Plovers and lapwings
Order: CharadriiformesFamily: Charadriidae

The family Charadriidae includes the plovers, dotterels and lapwings. They are small to medium-sized birds with compact bodies, short, thick necks and long, usually pointed, wings. They are found in open country worldwide, mostly in habitats near water.

Black-bellied plover, Pluvialis squatarola
Pacific golden-plover, Pluvialis fulva (A)
Long-toed lapwing, Vanellus crassirostris
Blacksmith lapwing, Vanellus armatus
Spur-winged lapwing, Vanellus spinosus
White-headed lapwing, Vanellus albiceps
Senegal lapwing, Vanellus lugubris
Crowned lapwing, Vanellus coronatus
Wattled lapwing, Vanellus senegallus
Caspian plover, Charadrius asiaticus
Kittlitz's plover, Charadrius pecuarius
Kentish plover, Charadrius alexandrinus
Common ringed plover, Charadrius hiaticula
Three-banded plover, Charadrius tricollaris
Forbes's plover, Charadrius forbesi
White-fronted plover, Charadrius marginatus
Chestnut-banded plover, Charadrius pallidus

Painted-snipes
Order: CharadriiformesFamily: Rostratulidae

Painted-snipes are short-legged, long-billed birds similar in shape to the true snipes, but more brightly coloured.

Greater painted-snipe, Rostratula benghalensis

Jacanas
Order: CharadriiformesFamily: Jacanidae

The jacanas are a group of tropical waders in the family Jacanidae. They are found throughout the tropics. They are identifiable by their huge feet and claws which enable them to walk on floating vegetation in the shallow lakes that are their preferred habitat.

Lesser jacana, Microparra capensis
African jacana, Actophilornis africanus

Sandpipers and allies
Order: CharadriiformesFamily: Scolopacidae

Scolopacidae is a large diverse family of small to medium-sized shorebirds including the sandpipers, curlews, godwits, shanks, tattlers, woodcocks, snipes, dowitchers and phalaropes. The majority of these species eat small invertebrates picked out of the mud or soil. Variation in length of legs and bills enables multiple species to feed in the same habitat, particularly on the coast, without direct competition for food.

Whimbrel, Numenius phaeopus
Eurasian curlew, Numenius arquata
Bar-tailed godwit, Limosa lapponica
Black-tailed godwit, Limosa limosa (A)
Ruddy turnstone, Arenaria interpres
Red knot, Calidris canutus
Ruff, Calidris pugnax
Curlew sandpiper, Calidris ferruginea
Sanderling, Calidris alba
Dunlin, Calidris alpina (A)
Little stint, Calidris minuta
Great snipe, Gallinago media
African snipe, Gallinago nigripennis
Terek sandpiper, Xenus cinereus (A)
Red phalarope, Phalaropus fulicarius (A)
Common sandpiper, Actitis hypoleucos
Green sandpiper, Tringa ochropus
Solitary sandpiper, Tringa solitaria (A)
Common greenshank, Tringa nebularia
Marsh sandpiper, Tringa stagnatilis
Wood sandpiper, Tringa glareola
Common redshank, Tringa totanus

Buttonquail
Order: CharadriiformesFamily: Turnicidae

The buttonquail are small, drab, running birds which resemble the true quails. The female is the brighter of the sexes and initiates courtship. The male incubates the eggs and tends the young.

Small buttonquail, Turnix sylvatica
Black-rumped buttonquail, Turnix nanus

Pratincoles and coursers
Order: CharadriiformesFamily: Glareolidae

Glareolidae is a family of wading birds comprising the pratincoles, which have short legs, long pointed wings and long forked tails, and the coursers, which have long legs, short wings and long, pointed bills which curve downwards.

Burchell's courser, Cursorius rufus
Temminck's courser, Cursorius temminckii
Double-banded courser, Smutsornis africanus
Three-banded courser, Rhinoptilus cinctus
Bronze-winged courser, Rhinoptilus chalcopterus
Collared pratincole, Glareola pratincola
Black-winged pratincole, Glareola nordmanni
Rock pratincole, Glareola nuchalis
Gray pratincole, Glareola cinerea

Skuas and jaegers
Order: CharadriiformesFamily: Stercorariidae

The family Stercorariidae are, in general, medium to large birds, typically with grey or brown plumage, often with white markings on the wings. They nest on the ground in temperate and arctic regions and are long-distance migrants.

Brown skua, Stercorarius antarctica (A)
Pomarine jaeger, Stercorarius pomarinus
Parasitic jaeger, Stercorarius parasiticus
Long-tailed jaeger, Stercorarius longicaudus (A)

Gulls, terns, and skimmers
Order: CharadriiformesFamily: Laridae

Laridae is a family of medium to large seabirds, the gulls, terns, and skimmers. Gulls are typically grey or white, often with black markings on the head or wings. They have stout, longish bills and webbed feet. Terns are a group of generally medium to large seabirds typically with grey or white plumage, often with black markings on the head. Most terns hunt fish by diving but some pick insects off the surface of fresh water. Terns are generally long-lived birds, with several species known to live in excess of 30 years. Skimmers are a small family of tropical tern-like birds. They have an elongated lower mandible which they use to feed by flying low over the water surface and skimming the water for small fish.

Sabine's gull, Xema sabini (A)
Gray-hooded gull, Chroicocephalus cirrocephalus
Black-headed gull, Chroicocephalus ridibundus (A)
Little gull, Hydrocoloeus minutus (A)
Franklin's gull, Leucophaeus pipixcan (A)
Lesser black-backed gull, Larus fuscus
Kelp gull, Larus dominicanus
Brown noddy, Anous stolidus
Sooty tern, Onychoprion fuscatus
Little tern, Sternula albifrons (A)
Damara tern, Sternula balaenarum
Gull-billed tern, Gelochelidon nilotica (A)
Caspian tern, Hydroprogne caspia
Black tern, Chlidonias niger
White-winged tern, Chlidonias leucopterus
Whiskered tern, Chlidonias hybrida
Roseate tern, Sterna dougallii
Common tern, Sterna hirundo
Arctic tern, Sterna paradisaea
Great crested tern, Thalasseus bergii (A)
Sandwich tern, Thalasseus sandvicensis
West African crested tern, Thalasseus albididorsalis
African skimmer, Rynchops flavirostris

Tropicbirds
Order: PhaethontiformesFamily: Phaethontidae

Tropicbirds are slender white birds of tropical oceans, with exceptionally long central tail feathers. Their heads and long wings have black markings.

White-tailed tropicbird, Phaethon lepturus (A)
Red-billed tropicbird, Phaethon aethereus (A)

Penguins
Order: SphenisciformesFamily: Spheniscidae

The penguins are a group of aquatic, flightless birds living almost exclusively in the Southern Hemisphere. Most penguins feed on krill, fish, squid and other forms of sealife caught while swimming underwater.

African penguin, Spheniscus demersus

Albatrosses
Order: ProcellariiformesFamily: Diomedeidae

The albatrosses are among the largest of flying birds, and the great albatrosses from the genus Diomedea have the largest wingspans of any extant birds.

Yellow-nosed albatross, Thalassarche chlororhynchos (A)
Gray-headed albatross, Thalassarche chrysostoma (A)
White-capped albatross, Thalassarche cauta (A)
Salvin's albatross, Thalassarche salvini
Black-browed albatross, Thalassarche melanophris (A)
Royal albatross, Diomedea epomophora (A)
Wandering albatross, Diomedea exulans

Southern storm-petrels
Order: ProcellariiformesFamily: Oceanitidae

The southern-storm petrels are relatives of the petrels and are the smallest seabirds. They feed on planktonic crustaceans and small fish picked from the surface, typically while hovering. The flight is fluttering and sometimes bat-like.

Wilson's storm-petrel, Oceanites oceanicus

Northern storm-petrels
Order: ProcellariiformesFamily: Hydrobatidae

Though the members of this family are similar in many respects to the southern storm-petrels, including their general appearance and habits, there are enough genetic differences to warrant their placement in a separate family.

European storm-petrel, Hydrobates pelagicus
Leach's storm-petrel, Hydrobates leucorhous

Shearwaters and petrels
Order: ProcellariiformesFamily: Procellariidae

The procellariids are the main group of medium-sized "true petrels", characterised by united nostrils with medium septum and a long outer functional primary.

Southern giant-petrel, Macronectes giganteus (A)
Northern giant-petrel, Macronectes halli
Cape petrel, Daption capense
Great-winged petrel, Pterodroma macroptera (A)
Soft-plumaged petrel, Pterodroma mollis (A)
Antarctic prion, Pachyptila desolata
White-chinned petrel, Procellaria aequinoctialis
Cory's shearwater, Calonectris diomedea (A)
Great shearwater, Ardenna gravis (A)
Sooty shearwater, Ardenna griseus
Manx shearwater, Puffinus puffinus (A)

Storks
Order: CiconiiformesFamily: Ciconiidae

Storks are large, long-legged, long-necked, wading birds with long, stout bills. Storks are mute, but bill-clattering is an important mode of communication at the nest. Their nests can be large and may be reused for many years. Many species are migratory.

African openbill, Anastomus lamelligerus
Black stork, Ciconia nigra
Abdim's stork, Ciconia abdimii
African woolly-necked stork, Ciconia microscelis
White stork, Ciconia ciconia
Saddle-billed stork, Ephippiorhynchus senegalensis
Marabou stork, Leptoptilos crumenifer
Yellow-billed stork, Mycteria ibis

Boobies and gannets
Order: SuliformesFamily: Sulidae

The sulids comprise the gannets and boobies. Both groups are medium to large coastal seabirds that plunge-dive for fish.

Brown booby, Sula leucogaster (A)
Northern gannet, Morus bassanus
Cape gannet, Morus capensis

Anhingas
Order: SuliformesFamily: Anhingidae

Anhingas or darters are often called "snake-birds" because of their long thin neck, which gives a snake-like appearance when they swim with their bodies submerged. The males have black and dark-brown plumage, an erectile crest on the nape and a larger bill than the female. The females have much paler plumage especially on the neck and underparts. The darters have completely webbed feet and their legs are short and set far back on the body. Their plumage is somewhat permeable, like that of cormorants, and they spread their wings to dry after diving.

African darter, Anhinga rufa

Cormorants and shags
Order: SuliformesFamily: Phalacrocoracidae

Phalacrocoracidae is a family of medium to large coastal, fish-eating seabirds that includes cormorants and shags. Plumage colouration varies, with the majority having mainly dark plumage, some species being black-and-white and a few being colourful.

Long-tailed cormorant, Microcarbo africanus
Crowned cormorant, Microcarbo coronatus
Bank cormorant, Phalacrocorax neglectus
Cape cormorant, Phalacrocorax capensis
Great cormorant, Phalacrocorax carbo

Pelicans
Order: PelecaniformesFamily: Pelecanidae

Pelicans are large water birds with a distinctive pouch under their beak. As with other members of the order Pelecaniformes, they have webbed feet with four toes.

Great white pelican, Pelecanus onocrotalus
Pink-backed pelican, Pelecanus rufescens

Shoebill
Order: PelecaniformesFamily: Balaenicipididae

The shoebill is a large bird related to the storks. It derives its name from its massive shoe-shaped bill.

Shoebill, Balaeniceps rex

Hammerkop
Order: PelecaniformesFamily: Scopidae

The hammerkop is a medium-sized bird with a long shaggy crest. The shape of its head with a curved bill and crest at the back is reminiscent of a hammer, hence its name. Its plumage is drab-brown all over.

Hamerkop, Scopus umbretta

Herons, egrets, and bitterns
Order: PelecaniformesFamily: Ardeidae

The family Ardeidae contains the bitterns, herons and egrets. Herons and egrets are medium to large wading birds with long necks and legs. Bitterns tend to be shorter necked and more wary. Members of Ardeidae fly with their necks retracted, unlike other long-necked birds such as storks, ibises and spoonbills.

Great bittern, Botaurus stellaris
Little bittern, Ixobrychus minutus
Dwarf bittern, Ixobrychus sturmii
White-crested bittern, Tigriornis leucolophus
Gray heron, Ardea cinerea
Black-headed heron, Ardea melanocephala
Goliath heron, Ardea goliath
Purple heron, Ardea purpurea
Great egret, Ardea alba
Intermediate egret, Ardea intermedia
Little egret, Egretta garzetta
Slaty egret, Egretta vinaceigula (A) 
Black heron, Egretta ardesiaca
Cattle egret, Bubulcus ibis
Squacco heron, Ardeola ralloides
Malagasy pond-heron, Ardeola idae (A) 
Rufous-bellied heron, Ardeola rufiventris
Striated heron, Butorides striata
Black-crowned night-heron, Nycticorax nycticorax
White-backed night-heron, Gorsachius leuconotus

Ibises and spoonbills
Order: PelecaniformesFamily: Threskiornithidae

Threskiornithidae is a family of large terrestrial and wading birds which includes the ibises and spoonbills. They have long, broad wings with 11 primary and about 20 secondary feathers. They are strong fliers and despite their size and weight, very capable soarers.

Glossy ibis, Plegadis falcinellus
African sacred ibis, Threskiornis aethiopicus
Spot-breasted ibis, Bostrychia rara
Hadada ibis, Bostrychia hagedash
African spoonbill, Platalea alba

Secretarybird
Order: AccipitriformesFamily: Sagittariidae

The secretarybird is a bird of prey in the order Falconiformes but is easily distinguished from other raptors by its long crane-like legs.

Secretarybird, Sagittarius serpentarius

Osprey
Order: AccipitriformesFamily: Pandionidae

The family Pandionidae contains only one species, the osprey. The osprey is a medium-large raptor which is a specialist fish-eater with a worldwide distribution.

Osprey, Pandion haliaetus

Hawks, eagles, and kites
Order: AccipitriformesFamily: Accipitridae

Accipitridae is a family of birds of prey, which includes hawks, eagles, kites, harriers and Old World vultures. These birds have powerful hooked beaks for tearing flesh from their prey, strong legs, powerful talons and keen eyesight.

Black-winged kite, Elanus caeruleus
African harrier-hawk, Polyboroides typus
Palm-nut vulture, Gypohierax angolensis
Egyptian vulture, Neophron percnopterus
European honey-buzzard, Pernis apivorus
African cuckoo-hawk, Aviceda cuculoides
White-headed vulture, Trigonoceps occipitalis
Lappet-faced vulture, Torgos tracheliotos
Hooded vulture, Necrosyrtes monachus
White-backed vulture, Gyps africanus
Bateleur, Terathopius ecaudatus
Congo serpent-eagle, Dryotriorchis spectabilis
Black-chested snake-eagle, Circaetus pectoralis
Brown snake-eagle, Circaetus cinereus
Banded snake-eagle, Circaetus cinerascens
Bat hawk, Macheiramphus alcinus
Crowned eagle, Stephanoaetus coronatus
Martial eagle, Polemaetus bellicosus
Long-crested eagle, Lophaetus occipitalis
Lesser spotted eagle, Clanga pomarina
Wahlberg's eagle, Hieraaetus wahlbergi
Booted eagle, Hieraaetus pennatus (A)
Ayres's hawk-eagle, Hieraaetus ayresii
Tawny eagle, Aquila rapax
Steppe eagle, Aquila nipalensis (A)
Cassin's hawk-eagle, Aquila africana
Verreaux's eagle, Aquila verreauxii
African hawk-eagle, Aquila spilogaster
Lizard buzzard, Kaupifalco monogrammicus
Dark chanting-goshawk, Melierax metabates
Pale chanting-goshawk, Melierax canorus
Gabar goshawk, Micronisus gabar
Eurasian marsh-harrier, Circus aeruginosus
African marsh-harrier, Circus ranivorus
Pallid harrier, Circus macrourus
Montagu's harrier, Circus pygargus
African goshawk, Accipiter tachiro
Chestnut-flanked sparrowhawk, Accipiter castanilius
Shikra, Accipiter badius
Little sparrowhawk, Accipiter minullus
Ovambo sparrowhawk, Accipiter ovampensis
Rufous-breasted sparrowhawk, Accipiter rufiventris
Black goshawk, Accipiter melanoleucus
Long-tailed hawk, Urotriorchis macrourus
Black kite, Milvus migrans
African fish-eagle, Haliaeetus vocifer
Common buzzard, Buteo buteo
Red-necked buzzard, Buteo auguralis
Augur buzzard, Buteo augur

Barn-owls
Order: StrigiformesFamily: Tytonidae

Barn-owls are medium to large owls with large heads and characteristic heart-shaped faces. They have long strong legs with powerful talons.

African grass-owl, Tyto capensis
Barn owl, Tyto alba

Owls
Order: StrigiformesFamily: Strigidae

The typical owls are small to large solitary nocturnal birds of prey. They have large forward-facing eyes and ears, a hawk-like beak and a conspicuous circle of feathers around each eye called a facial disk.

Eurasian scops-owl, Otus scops
African scops-owl, Otus senegalensis
Southern white-faced owl, Ptilopsis granti
Spotted eagle-owl, Bubo africanus
Fraser's eagle-owl, Bubo poensis
Shelley's eagle-owl, Bubo shelleyi
Verreaux's eagle-owl, Bubo lacteus
Akun eagle-owl, Bubo leucostictus
Pel's fishing-owl, Scotopelia peli
Vermiculated fishing-owl, Scotopelia bouvieri
Pearl-spotted owlet, Glaucidium perlatum
African barred owlet, Glaucidium capense
African wood-owl, Strix woodfordii
Marsh owl, Asio capensis

Mousebirds
Order: ColiiformesFamily: Coliidae

The mousebirds are slender greyish or brown birds with soft, hairlike body feathers and very long thin tails. They are arboreal and scurry through the leaves like rodents in search of berries, fruit and buds. They are acrobatic and can feed upside down. All species have strong claws and reversible outer toes. They also have crests and stubby bills.

Speckled mousebird, Colius striatus
Red-backed mousebird, Colius castanotus (E)
Red-faced mousebird, Urocolius indicus

Trogons
Order: TrogoniformesFamily: Trogonidae

The family Trogonidae includes trogons and quetzals. Found in tropical woodlands worldwide, they feed on insects and fruit, and their broad bills and weak legs reflect their diet and arboreal habits. Although their flight is fast, they are reluctant to fly any distance. Trogons have soft, often colourful, feathers with distinctive male and female plumage.

Narina trogon, Apaloderma narina
Bar-tailed trogon, Apaloderma vittatum

Hoopoes
Order: BucerotiformesFamily: Upupidae

Hoopoes have black, white and orangey-pink colouring with a large erectile crest on their head.

Eurasian hoopoe, Upupa epops

Woodhoopoes and scimitarbills
Order: BucerotiformesFamily: Phoeniculidae

The woodhoopoes are related to the kingfishers, rollers and hoopoes. They most resemble the hoopoes with their long curved bills, used to probe for insects, and short rounded wings. However, they differ in that they have metallic plumage, often blue, green or purple, and lack an erectile crest.

Green woodhoopoe, Phoeniculus purpureus
Violet woodhoopoe, Phoeniculus damarensis
Black scimitarbill, Rhinopomastus aterrimus
Common scimitarbill, Rhinopomastus cyanomelas

Ground-hornbills
Order: BucerotiformesFamily: Bucorvidae

The ground-hornbills are terrestrial birds which feed almost entirely on insects, other birds, snakes, and amphibians.

Southern ground-hornbill, Bucorvus leadbeateri

Hornbills
Order: BucerotiformesFamily: Bucerotidae

Hornbills are a group of birds whose bill is shaped like a cow's horn, but without a twist, sometimes with a casque on the upper mandible. Frequently, the bill is brightly coloured.

Red-billed dwarf hornbill, Lophoceros camurus
Crowned hornbill, Lophoceros alboterminatus
Bradfield's hornbill, Lophoceros bradfieldi
African pied hornbill, Lophoceros fasciatus
African gray hornbill, Lophoceros nasutus
Pale-billed hornbill, Lophoceros pallidirostris
Southern yellow-billed hornbill, Tockus leucomelas
Monteiro's hornbill, Tockus monteiri
Southern red-billed hornbill, Tockus rufirostris
Damara red-billed hornbill, Tockus damarensis
White-crested hornbill, Horizocerus albocristatus
Black dwarf hornbill, Horizocerus hartlaubi
Black-casqued hornbill, Ceratogymna atrata
Black-and-white-casqued hornbill, Bycanistes subcylindricus
Brown-cheeked hornbill, Bycanistes cylindricus
White-thighed hornbill, Ceratogymna albotibialis
Trumpeter hornbill, Bycanistes bucinator
Piping hornbill, Bycanistes fistulator

Kingfishers
Order: CoraciiformesFamily: Alcedinidae

Kingfishers are medium-sized birds with large heads, long, pointed bills, short legs and stubby tails.

Half-collared kingfisher, Alcedo semitorquata
Shining-blue kingfisher, Alcedo quadribrachys
Malachite kingfisher, Corythornis cristatus
White-bellied kingfisher, Corythornis leucogaster
African pygmy kingfisher, Ispidina picta
African dwarf kingfisher, Ispidina lecontei
Chocolate-backed kingfisher, Halcyon badia
Gray-headed kingfisher, Halcyon leucocephala
Woodland kingfisher, Halcyon senegalensis
Blue-breasted kingfisher, Halcyon malimbica
Brown-hooded kingfisher, Halcyon albiventris
Striped kingfisher, Halcyon chelicuti
Giant kingfisher, Megaceryle maximus
Pied kingfisher, Ceryle rudis

Bee-eaters
Order: CoraciiformesFamily: Meropidae

The bee-eaters are a group of near passerine birds in the family Meropidae. Most species are found in Africa but others occur in southern Europe, Madagascar, Australia and New Guinea. They are characterised by richly coloured plumage, slender bodies and usually elongated central tail feathers. All are colourful and have long downturned bills and pointed wings, which give them a swallow-like appearance when seen from afar.

Black bee-eater, Merops gularis
White-fronted bee-eater, Merops bullockoides
Little bee-eater, Merops pusillus
Blue-breasted bee-eater, Merops variegatus
Swallow-tailed bee-eater, Merops hirundineus
Black-headed bee-eater, Merops breweri
White-throated bee-eater, Merops albicollis (A)
Blue-cheeked bee-eater, Merops persicus
Madagascar bee-eater, Merops superciliosus
European bee-eater, Merops apiaster
Rosy bee-eater, Merops malimbicus
Southern carmine bee-eater, Merops nubicoides

Rollers
Order: CoraciiformesFamily: Coraciidae

Rollers resemble crows in size and build, but are more closely related to the kingfishers and bee-eaters. They share the colourful appearance of those groups with blues and browns predominating. The two inner front toes are connected, but the outer toe is not.

European roller, Coracias garrulus
Lilac-breasted roller, Coracias caudata
Racket-tailed roller, Coracias spatulata
Rufous-crowned roller, Coracias naevia
Broad-billed roller, Eurystomus glaucurus
Blue-throated roller, Eurystomus gularis

African barbets
Order: PiciformesFamily: Lybiidae

The African barbets are plump birds, with short necks and large heads. They get their name from the bristles which fringe their heavy bills. Most species are brightly coloured.

Yellow-billed barbet, Trachyphonus purpuratus
Crested barbet, Trachyphonus vaillantii
Gray-throated barbet, Gymnobucco bonapartei
Sladen's barbet, Gymnobucco sladeni
Bristle-nosed barbet, Gymnobucco peli
Naked-faced barbet, Gymnobucco calvus
Anchieta's barbet, Stactolaema anchietae
Speckled tinkerbird, Pogoniulus scolopaceus
Western tinkerbird, Pogoniulus coryphaea
Red-rumped tinkerbird, Pogoniulus atroflavus
Yellow-throated tinkerbird, Pogoniulus subsulphureus
Yellow-rumped tinkerbird, Pogoniulus bilineatus
Yellow-fronted tinkerbird, Pogoniulus chrysoconus
Yellow-spotted barbet, Buccanodon duchaillui
Hairy-breasted barbet, Tricholaema hirsuta
Miombo barbet, Tricholaema frontata
Pied barbet, Tricholaema leucomelas
White-headed barbet, Lybius leucocephalus
Black-collared barbet, Lybius torquatus
Black-backed barbet, Lybius minor
Double-toothed barbet, Lybius bidentatus

Honeyguides
Order: PiciformesFamily: Indicatoridae

Honeyguides are among the few birds that feed on wax. They are named for the greater honeyguide which leads traditional honey-hunters to bees' nests and, after the hunters have harvested the honey, feeds on the remaining contents of the hive.

Cassin's honeyguide, Prodotiscus insignis
Green-backed honeyguide, Prodotiscus zambesiae
Wahlberg's honeyguide, Prodotiscus regulus
Willcocks's honeyguide, Prodotiscus willcocksi (A)
Pallid honeyguide, Indicator meliphilus
Least honeyguide, Indicator exilis
Lesser honeyguide, Indicator minor
Spotted honeyguide, Indicator maculatus
Scaly-throated honeyguide, Indicator variegatus
Greater honeyguide, Indicator indicator
Lyre-tailed honeyguide, Melichneutes robustus

Woodpeckers
Order: PiciformesFamily: Picidae

Woodpeckers are small to medium-sized birds with chisel-like beaks, short legs, stiff tails and long tongues used for capturing insects. Some species have feet with two toes pointing forward and two backward, while several species have only three toes. Many woodpeckers have the habit of tapping noisily on tree trunks with their beaks.

Rufous-necked wryneck, Jynx ruficollis
African piculet, Verreauxia africana
Elliot's woodpecker, Chloropicus elliotii
Cardinal woodpecker, Chloropicus fuscescens
Bearded woodpecker, Chloropicus namaquus
Golden-crowned woodpecker, Chloropicus xantholophus
African gray woodpecker, Chloropicus goertae
Olive woodpecker, Chloropicus griseocephalus
Brown-eared woodpecker, Campethera caroli
Buff-spotted woodpecker, Campethera nivosa
Green-backed woodpecker, Campethera cailliautii
Bennett's woodpecker, Campethera bennettii
Reichenow's woodpecker, Campethera scriptoricauda
Golden-tailed woodpecker, Campethera abingoni

Falcons and caracaras
Order: FalconiformesFamily: Falconidae

Falconidae is a family of diurnal birds of prey. They differ from hawks, eagles and kites in that they kill with their beaks instead of their talons.

Pygmy falcon, Polihierax semitorquatus
Lesser kestrel, Falco naumanni
Eurasian kestrel, Falco tinnunculus
Rock kestrel, Falco rupicolus
Greater kestrel, Falco rupicoloides
Gray kestrel, Falco ardosiaceus
Dickinson's kestrel, Falco dickinsoni
Red-necked falcon, Falco chicquera (A)
Red-footed falcon, Falco vespertinus
Amur falcon, Falco amurensis
Eurasian hobby, Falco subbuteo
African hobby, Falco cuvierii
Lanner falcon, Falco biarmicus
Peregrine falcon, Falco peregrinus

Old World parrots
Order: PsittaciformesFamily: Psittaculidae.

Characteristic features of parrots include a strong curved bill, an upright stance, strong legs, and clawed zygodactyl feet. Many parrots are vividly colored, and some are multi-colored. Old World parrots are found from Africa east across south and southeast Asia and Oceania to Australia and New Zealand.

Red-headed lovebird, Agapornis pullarius
Rosy-faced lovebird, Agapornis roseicollis

African and New World parrots
Order: PsittaciformesFamily: Psittacidae.

Characteristic features of parrots include a strong curved bill, an upright stance, strong legs, and clawed zygodactyl feet. Many parrots are vividly coloured, and some are multi-coloured. Most of the more than 150 species in this family are found in the New World.

Gray parrot, Psittacus erithacus
Brown-necked parrot, Poicephalus robustus
Red-fronted parrot, Poicephalus gulielmi
Meyer's parrot, Poicephalus meyeri
Rüppell's parrot, Poicephalus rueppellii

African and green broadbills
Order: PasseriformesFamily: Calyptomenidae

The broadbills are small, brightly coloured birds, which feed on fruit and also take insects in flycatcher fashion, snapping their broad bills. Their habitat is canopies of wet forests.

African broadbill, Smithornis capensis
Rufous-sided broadbill, Smithornis rufolateralis

Pittas
Order: PasseriformesFamily: Pittidae

Pittas are medium-sized by passerine standards and are stocky, with fairly long, strong legs, short tails and stout bills. Many are brightly coloured. They spend the majority of their time on wet forest floors, eating snails, insects and similar invertebrates.

African pitta, Pitta angolensis

Cuckooshrikes
Order: PasseriformesFamily: Campephagidae

The cuckooshrikes are small to medium-sized passerine birds. They are predominantly greyish with white and black, although some species are brightly coloured.

White-breasted cuckooshrike, Coracina pectoralis
Black cuckooshrike, Campephaga flava
Petit's cuckooshrike, Campephaga petiti
Red-shouldered cuckooshrike, Campephaga phoenicea
Purple-throated cuckooshrike, Campephaga quiscalina

Old World orioles
Order: PasseriformesFamily: Oriolidae

The Old World orioles are colourful passerine birds. They are not related to the New World orioles.

Eurasian golden oriole, Oriolus oriolus
African golden oriole, Oriolus auratus
Western black-headed oriole, Oriolus brachyrhynchus
African black-headed oriole, Oriolus larvatus
Black-winged oriole, Oriolus nigripennis

Wattle-eyes and batises
Order: PasseriformesFamily: Platysteiridae

The wattle-eyes, or puffback flycatchers, are small stout passerine birds of the African tropics. They get their name from the brightly coloured fleshy eye decorations found in most species in this group.

White-tailed shrike, Lanioturdus torquatus
Brown-throated wattle-eye, Platysteira cyanea
White-fronted wattle-eye, Platysteira albifrons (E)
Black-throated wattle-eye, Platysteira peltata
Chestnut wattle-eye, Platysteira castanea
Red-cheeked wattle-eye, Platysteira blissetti
Black-necked wattle-eye, Platysteira chalybea
Yellow-bellied wattle-eye, Platysteira concreta
Boulton's batis, Batis margaritae
Chinspot batis, Batis molitor
Pririt batis, Batis pririt
Western black-headed batis, Batis erlangeri
Angolan batis, Batis minulla

Vangas, helmetshrikes, and allies
Order: PasseriformesFamily: Vangidae

The helmetshrikes are similar in build to the shrikes, but tend to be colourful species with distinctive crests or other head ornaments, such as wattles, from which they get their name.

White helmetshrike, Prionops plumatus
Red-billed helmetshrike, Prionops caniceps
Rufous-bellied helmetshrike, Prionops rufiventris
Retz's helmetshrike, Prionops retzii
Angola helmetshrike, Prionops gabela (E)
African shrike-flycatcher, Megabyas flammulatus
Black-and-white shrike-flycatcher, Bias musicus

Bushshrikes and allies
Order: PasseriformesFamily: Malaconotidae

Bushshrikes are similar in habits to shrikes, hunting insects and other small prey from a perch on a bush. Although similar in build to the shrikes, these tend to be either colourful species or largely black; some species are quite secretive.

Brubru, Nilaus afer
Northern puffback, Dryoscopus gambensis
Black-backed puffback, Dryoscopus cubla
Red-eyed puffback, Dryoscopus senegalensis
Pink-footed puffback, Dryoscopus angolensis
Sabine's puffback, Dryoscopus sabini
Marsh tchagra, Tchagra minuta
Black-crowned tchagra, Tchagra senegala
Brown-crowned tchagra, Tchagra australis
Lühder's bushshrike, Laniarius luehderi
Braun's bushshrike, Laniarius brauni (E)
Gabela bushshrike, Laniarius amboimensis (E)
Tropical boubou, Laniarius major
Gabon boubou, Laniarius bicolor
Crimson-breasted gonolek, Laniarius atrococcineus
Lowland sooty boubou, Laniarius leucorhynchus
Bokmakierie, Telophorus zeylonus
Gray-green bushshrike, Telophorus bocagei
Sulphur-breasted bushshrike, Telophorus sulfureopectus
Many-colored bushshrike, Telophorus multicolor
Black-fronted bushshrike, Telophorus nigrifrons
Four-colored bushshrike, Telophorus viridis
Gray-headed bushshrike, Malaconotus blanchoti
Monteiro's bushshrike, Malaconotus monteiri

Drongos
Order: PasseriformesFamily: Dicruridae

The drongos are mostly black or dark grey in colour, sometimes with metallic tints. They have long forked tails, and some Asian species have elaborate tail decorations. They have short legs and sit very upright when perched, like a shrike. They flycatch or take prey from the ground.

Sharpe's drongo, Dicrurus sharpei
Common square-tailed drongo, Dicrurus ludwigii
Fork-tailed drongo, Dicrurus adsimilis
Fanti drongo, Dicrurus atactus
Velvet-mantled drongo, Dicrurus modestus
Hair-crested drongo, Dicrurus hottentottus

Monarch flycatchers
Order: PasseriformesFamily: Monarchidae

The monarch flycatchers are small to medium-sized insectivorous passerines which hunt by flycatching.

Blue-headed crested-flycatcher, Trochocercus nitens
Black-headed paradise-flycatcher, Terpsiphone rufiventer
Rufous-vented paradise-flycatcher, Terpsiphone rufocinerea
Bates's paradise-flycatcher, Terpsiphone batesi
African paradise-flycatcher, Terpsiphone viridis

Shrikes
Order: PasseriformesFamily: Laniidae

Shrikes are passerine birds known for their habit of catching other birds and small animals and impaling the uneaten portions of their bodies on thorns. A typical shrike's beak is hooked, like a bird of prey.

Red-backed shrike, Lanius collurio
Lesser gray shrike, Lanius minor
Magpie shrike, Lanius melanoleucus
Mackinnon's shrike, Lanius mackinnoni
Northern fiscal, Lanius humeralis
Southern fiscal, Lanius collaris
Souza's shrike, Lanius souzae
Woodchat shrike, Lanius senator (A)
White-crowned shrike, Eurocephalus anguitimens

Crows, jays, and magpies
Order: PasseriformesFamily: Corvidae

The family Corvidae includes crows, ravens, jays, choughs, magpies, treepies, nutcrackers and ground jays. Corvids are above average in size among the Passeriformes, and some of the larger species show high levels of intelligence.

Cape crow, Corvus capensis
Pied crow, Corvus albus

Hyliotas
Order: PasseriformesFamily: Hyliotidae

The members of this small family, all of genus Hyliota, are birds of the forest canopy. They tend to feed in mixed-species flocks.

Yellow-bellied hyliota, Hyliota flavigaster
Southern hyliota, Hyliota australis

Fairy flycatchers
Order: PasseriformesFamily: Stenostiridae

Most of the species of this small family are found in Africa, though a few inhabit tropical Asia. They are not closely related to other birds called "flycatchers".

African blue flycatcher, Elminia longicauda
White-tailed blue flycatcher, Elminia albicauda

Tits, chickadees, and titmice
Order: PasseriformesFamily: Paridae

The Paridae are mainly small stocky woodland species with short stout bills. Some have crests. They are adaptable birds, with a mixed diet including seeds and insects.

White-winged black-tit, Melaniparus leucomelas
Rufous-bellied tit, Melaniparus rufiventris
Southern black-tit, Melaniparus niger
Carp's tit, Melaniparus carpi
Dusky tit, Melaniparus funereus
Miombo tit, Melaniparus griseiventris
Ashy tit, Melaniparus cinerascens

Penduline-tits
Order: PasseriformesFamily: Remizidae

The penduline-tits are a group of small passerine birds related to the true tits. They are insectivores.

African penduline-tit, Anthoscopus caroli
Southern penduline-tit, Anthoscopus minutus

Larks
Order: PasseriformesFamily: Alaudidae

Larks are small terrestrial birds with often extravagant songs and display flights. Most larks are fairly dull in appearance. Their food is insects and seeds.

Spike-heeled lark, Chersomanes albofasciata
Gray's lark, Ammomanopsis grayi
Karoo long-billed lark, Certhilauda subcoronata 
Dusky lark, Pinarocorys nigricans
Chestnut-backed sparrow-lark, Eremopterix leucotis
Gray-backed sparrow-lark, Eremopterix verticalis
Sabota lark, Calendulauda sabota
Fawn-coloured lark, Calendulauda africanoides
Rufous-naped lark, Mirafra africana
Angola lark, Mirafra angolensis
Flappet lark, Mirafra rufocinnamomea
Monotonous lark, Mirafra passerina (A)
Red-capped lark, Calandrella cinerea
Stark's lark, Spizocorys starki
Pink-billed lark, Spizocorys conirostris (A)

Nicators
Order: PasseriformesFamily: Nicatoridae

The nicators are shrike-like, with hooked bills. They are endemic to sub-Saharan Africa.

Western nicator, Nicator chloris 
Yellow-throated nicator, Nicator vireo

African warblers
Order: PasseriformesFamily: Macrosphenidae

African warblers are small to medium-sized insectivores which are found in a wide variety of habitats south of the Sahara.

Green crombec, Sylvietta virens
Lemon-bellied crombec, Sylvietta denti
Red-capped crombec, Sylvietta ruficapilla
Cape crombec, Sylvietta rufescens
Rockrunner, Achaetops pycnopygius
Moustached grass-warbler, Melocichla mentalis
Yellow longbill, Macrosphenus flavicans
Gray longbill, Macrosphenus concolor
Pulitzer's longbill, Macrosphenus pulitzeri (E)
Green hylia, Hylia prasina
Tit-hylia, Pholidornis rushiae

Cisticolas and allies
Order: PasseriformesFamily: Cisticolidae

The Cisticolidae are warblers found mainly in warmer southern regions of the Old World. They are generally very small birds of drab brown or grey appearance found in open country such as grassland or scrub.

Salvadori's eremomela, Eremomela salvadorii
Yellow-bellied eremomela, Eremomela icteropygialis
Greencap eremomela, Eremomela scotops
Rufous-crowned eremomela, Eremomela badiceps
Black-necked eremomela, Eremomela atricollis
Burnt-neck eremomela, Eremomela usticollis
White-chinned prinia, Schistolais leucopogon
Miombo wren-warbler, Calamonastes undosus
Stierling's wren-warbler, Calamonastes stierlingi
Barred wren-warbler, Calamonastes fasciolatus
Green-backed camaroptera, Calamonastes brachyura
Hartert's camaroptera, Calamonastes harterti
Yellow-browed camaroptera, Calamonastes superciliaris
Olive-green camaroptera, Calamonastes chloronota
Black-throated apalis, Apalis jacksoni
Masked apalis, Apalis binotata
Yellow-breasted apalis, Apalis flavida
Buff-throated apalis, Apalis rufogularis
Gosling's apalis, Apalis goslingi
Gray apalis, Apalis cinerea
Brown-headed apalis, Apalis alticola
Tawny-flanked prinia, Prinia subflava
Black-chested prinia, Prinia flavicans
Banded prinia, Prinia bairdii'
Red-faced cisticola, Cisticola erythropsSinging cisticola, Cisticola cantansWhistling cisticola, Cisticola lateralisChattering cisticola, Cisticola anonymusBubbling cisticola, Cisticola bulliensRock-loving cisticola, Cisticola aberransRattling cisticola, Cisticola chinianaTinkling cisticola, Cisticola rufilatusRed-headed cisticola, Cisticola subruficapillusWailing cisticola, Cisticola laisLuapula cisticola, Cisticola luapulaChirping cisticola, Cisticola pipiensWinding cisticola, Cisticola marginatusLevaillant's cisticola, Cisticola tinniensStout cisticola, Cisticola robustusCroaking cisticola, Cisticola natalensisPiping cisticola, Cisticola fulvicapillusSlender-tailed cisticola, Cisticola melanurusSiffling cisticola, Cisticola brachypterusZitting cisticola, Cisticola juncidisDesert cisticola, Cisticola aridulusCloud cisticola, Cisticola textrixCloud-scraping cisticola, Cisticola damboPale-crowned cisticola, Cisticola cinnamomeusWing-snapping cisticola, Cisticola ayresiiReed warblers and allies
Order: PasseriformesFamily: Acrocephalidae

The members of this family are usually rather large for "warblers". Most are rather plain olivaceous brown above with much yellow to beige below. They are usually found in open woodland, reedbeds, or tall grass. The family occurs mostly in southern to western Eurasia and surroundings, but it also ranges far into the Pacific, with some species in Africa.

African yellow-warbler, Iduna natalensisIcterine warbler, Hippolais icterinaSedge warbler, Acrocephalus schoenobaenusCommon reed warbler, Acrocephalus scirpaceusLesser swamp warbler, Acrocephalus gracilirostrisGreater swamp warbler, Acrocephalus rufescensGreat reed warbler, Acrocephalus arundinaceusGrassbirds and allies
Order: PasseriformesFamily: Locustellidae

Locustellidae are a family of small insectivorous songbirds found mainly in Eurasia, Africa, and the Australian region. They are smallish birds with tails that are usually long and pointed, and tend to be drab brownish or buffy all over.

Fan-tailed grassbird, Catriscus brevirostrisEvergreen-forest warbler, Bradypterus lopeziLittle rush warbler, Bradypterus baboecalaSwallows
Order: PasseriformesFamily: Hirundinidae

The family Hirundinidae is adapted to aerial feeding. They have a slender streamlined body, long pointed wings and a short bill with a wide gape. The feet are adapted to perching rather than walking, and the front toes are partially joined at the base.

Plain martin, Riparia paludicolaBank swallow, Riparia ripariaBanded martin, Neophedina cinctaBrazza's martin, Phedinopsis brazzaeRock martin, Ptyonoprogne fuligulaBarn swallow, Hirundo rusticaAngola swallow, Hirundo angolensisWhite-throated blue swallow, Hirundo nigritaWhite-throated swallow, Hirundo albigularisWire-tailed swallow, Hirundo smithiiPearl-breasted swallow, Hirundo dimidiataBlack-and-rufous swallow, Hirundo nigrorufaGreater striped swallow, Cecropis cucullataLesser striped swallow, Cecropis abyssinicaRufous-chested swallow, Cecropis semirufaMosque swallow, Cecropis senegalensisRed-throated swallow, Petrochelidon rufigulaSouth African swallow, Petrochelidon spilodera (A)
Forest swallow, Atronanus fuliginosus (A)
Common house-martin, Delichon urbicumSquare-tailed sawwing, Psalidoprocne nitensWhite-headed sawwing, Psalidoprocne albicepsBlack sawwing, Psalidoprocne pristopteraGray-rumped swallow, Pseudhirundo griseopygaBulbuls
Order: PasseriformesFamily: Pycnonotidae

Bulbuls are medium-sized songbirds. Some are colourful with yellow, red or orange vents, cheeks, throats or supercilia, but most are drab, with uniform olive-brown to black plumage. Some species have distinct crests.

Slender-billed greenbul, Stelgidillas gracilirostrisGolden greenbul, Calyptocichla serinusBlack-collared bulbul, Neolestes torquatusRed-tailed bristlebill, Bleda syndactylusLesser bristlebill, Bleda notatusSimple greenbul, Chlorocichla simplexYellow-necked greenbul, Chlorocichla falkensteiniYellow-bellied greenbul, Chlorocichla flaviventrisHoneyguide greenbul, Baeopogon indicatorYellow-throated greenbul, Atimastillas flavicollisSpotted greenbul, Ixonotus guttatusSwamp greenbul, Thescelocichla leucopleuraRed-tailed greenbul, Criniger calurusEastern bearded-greenbul, Criniger chloronotusWhite-bearded greenbul, Criniger ndussumensisGray greenbul, Eurillas gracilisAnsorge's greenbul, Eurillas ansorgeiPlain greenbul, Eurillas curvirostrisYellow-whiskered bulbul, Eurillas latirostrisLittle greenbul, Eurillas virensLeaf-love, Phyllastrephus scandens (A)
Terrestrial brownbul, Phyllastrephus terrestrisPale-olive greenbul, Phyllastrephus fulviventrisGray-olive greenbul, Phyllastrephus cerviniventrisCabanis's greenbul, Phyllastrephus cabanisiIcterine greenbul, Phyllastrephus icterinusXavier's greenbul, Phyllastrephus xavieriWhite-throated greenbul, Phyllastrephus albigularisCommon bulbul, Pycnonotus barbatusBlack-fronted bulbul, Pycnonotus nigricansLeaf warblers
Order: PasseriformesFamily: Phylloscopidae

Leaf warblers are a family of small insectivorous birds found mostly in Eurasia and ranging into Wallacea and Africa. The species are of various sizes, often green-plumaged above and yellow below, or more subdued with grayish-green to grayish-brown colors.

Wood warbler, Phylloscopus sibilatrixWillow warbler, Phylloscopus trochilusLaura's woodland-warbler, Phylloscopus lauraeBush warblers and allies
Order: PasseriformesFamily: Scotocercidae

The members of this family are found throughout Africa, Asia, and Polynesia. Their taxonomy is in flux, and some authorities place genus Erythrocerus in another family.

Chestnut-capped flycatcher, Erythrocercus mccalliiSylviid warblers, parrotbills, and allies
Order: PasseriformesFamily: Sylviidae

The family Sylviidae is a group of small insectivorous passerine birds. They mainly occur as breeding species, as the common name implies, in Europe, Asia and, to a lesser extent, Africa. Most are of generally undistinguished appearance, but many have distinctive songs.

Garden warbler, Sylvia borinAfrican hill babbler, Sylvia abyssinicaChestnut-vented warbler, Curruca subcoeruleaGreater whitethroat, Curruca communis (A)

White-eyes, yuhinas, and allies
Order: PasseriformesFamily: Zosteropidae

The white-eyes are small and mostly undistinguished, their plumage above being generally some dull colour like greenish-olive, but some species have a white or bright yellow throat, breast or lower parts, and several have buff flanks. As their name suggests, many species have a white ring around each eye.

Northern yellow white-eye, Zosterops senegalensisOrange River white-eye, Zosterops pallidusSouthern yellow white-eye, Zosterops anderssoniGround babblers and allies
Order: PasseriformesFamily: Pellorneidae

These small to medium-sized songbirds have soft fluffy plumage but are otherwise rather diverse. Members of the genus Illadopsis are found in forests, but some other genera are birds of scrublands.

Brown illadopsis, Illadopsis fulvescensPale-breasted illadopsis, Illadopsis rufipennisScaly-breasted illadopsis, Illadopsis albipectusThrush babbler, Illadopsis turdinaLaughingthrushes and allies
Order: PasseriformesFamily: Leiothrichidae

The members of this family are diverse in size and colouration, though those of genus Turdoides tend to be brown or greyish. The family is found in Africa, India, and southeast Asia.

Arrow-marked babbler, Turdoides jardineiiBare-cheeked babbler, Turdoides gymnogenysHartlaub's babbler, Turdoides hartlaubiiBlack-faced babbler, Turdoides melanopsTreecreepers
Order: PasseriformesFamily: Certhiidae

Treecreepers are small woodland birds, brown above and white below. They have thin pointed down-curved bills, which they use to extricate insects from bark. They have stiff tail feathers, like woodpeckers, which they use to support themselves on vertical trees.

African spotted creeper, Salpornis salvadoriOxpeckers
Order: PasseriformesFamily: Buphagidae

As both the English and scientific names of these birds imply, they feed on ectoparasites, primarily ticks, found on large mammals.

Red-billed oxpecker, Buphagus erythrorynchusYellow-billed oxpecker, Buphagus africanusStarlings
Order: PasseriformesFamily: Sturnidae

Starlings are small to medium-sized passerine birds. Their flight is strong and direct and they are very gregarious. Their preferred habitat is fairly open country. They eat insects and fruit. Plumage is typically dark with a metallic sheen.

Wattled starling, Creatophora cinereaViolet-backed starling, Cinnyricinclus leucogasterPale-winged starling, Onychognathus nabouroupChestnut-winged starling, Onychognathus fulgidusBabbling starling, Neocichla gutturalisNarrow-tailed starling, Poeoptera lugubrisPurple-headed starling, Hylopsar purpureicepsBurchell's starling, Lamprotornis australisMeves's starling, Lamprotornis mevesiiSplendid starling, Lamprotornis splendidusSharp-tailed starling, Lamprotornis acuticaudusGreater blue-eared starling, Lamprotornis chalybaeusCape starling, Lamprotornis nitensThrushes and allies
Order: PasseriformesFamily: Turdidae

The thrushes are a group of passerine birds that occur mainly in the Old World. They are plump, soft plumaged, small to medium-sized insectivores or sometimes omnivores, often feeding on the ground. Many have attractive songs.

Rufous flycatcher-thrush, Neocossyphus fraseriWhite-tailed ant-thrush, Neocossyphus poensisOrange ground-thrush, Geokichla gurneyiGroundscraper thrush, Turdus litsitsirupaKurrichane thrush, Turdus libonyanaOlive thrush, Turdus olivaceusAfrican thrush, Turdus peliosOld World flycatchers
Order: PasseriformesFamily: Muscicapidae

Old World flycatchers are a large group of small passerine birds native to the Old World. They are mainly small arboreal insectivores. The appearance of these birds is highly varied, but they mostly have weak songs and harsh calls.

African dusky flycatcher, Muscicapa adustaLittle flycatcher, Muscicapa epulataSpotted flycatcher, Muscicapa striataCassin's flycatcher, Muscicapa cassiniBöhm's flycatcher, Bradornis boehmiSooty flycatcher, Bradornis fuliginosusDusky-blue flycatcher, Bradornis comitatusMariqua flycatcher, Bradornis mariquensisPale flycatcher, Agricola pallidusChat flycatcher, Agricola infuscatusWhite-browed forest-flycatcher, Fraseria cinerascensAfrican forest-flycatcher, Fraseria ocreataGray-throated tit-flycatcher, Fraseria griseigularisGray tit-flycatcher, Fraseria plumbeaAshy flycatcher, Fraseria caerulescensHerero chat, Melaenornis hereroSouthern black-flycatcher, Melaenornis pammelainaAngola slaty-flycatcher, Melaenornis brunneus (E)
Fire-crested alethe, Alethe castaneaForest scrub-robin, Cercotrichas leucostictaBearded scrub-robin, Cercotrichas quadrivirgataMiombo scrub-robin, Cercotrichas barbataKalahari scrub-robin, Cercotrichas paenaBrown-backed scrub-robin, Cercotrichas hartlaubiRed-backed scrub-robin, Cercotrichas leucophrysGray-winged robin-chat, Cossypha poliopteraWhite-browed robin-chat, Cossypha heugliniRed-capped robin-chat, Cossypha natalensisWhite-headed robin-chat, Cossypha heinrichiSnowy-crowned robin-chat, Cossypha niveicapillaAngola cave-chat, Xenocopsychus ansorgei (E)
Collared palm-thrush, Cichladusa arquataRufous-tailed palm-thrush, Cichladusa ruficaudaBrown-chested alethe, Chamaetylas poliocephalaBocage's akalat, Sheppardia bocageiGabela akalat, Sheppardia gabela (E)
European pied flycatcher, Ficedula hypoleucaCollared flycatcher, Ficedula albicollis (A)
Common redstart, Phoenicurus phoenicurusShort-toed rock-thrush, Monticola brevipesMiombo rock-thrush, Monticola angolensisAfrican stonechat, Saxicola torquatusKaroo chat, Emarginata schlegeliiTractrac chat, Emarginata tractracSooty chat, Myrmecocichla nigraSouthern anteater-chat, Myrmecocichla formicivoraCongo moor chat, Myrmecocichla tholloniMountain wheatear, Myrmecocichla monticolaArnot's chat, Myrmecocichla arnottiNorthern wheatear, Oenanthe oenantheCapped wheatear, Oenanthe pileataIsabelline wheatear, Oenanthe isabellinaWhite-fronted black-chat, Oenanthe albifronsFamiliar chat, Oenanthe familiarisSunbirds and spiderhunters
Order: PasseriformesFamily: Nectariniidae

The sunbirds and spiderhunters are very small passerine birds which feed largely on nectar, although they will also take insects, especially when feeding young. Flight is fast and direct on their short wings. Most species can take nectar by hovering like a hummingbird, but usually perch to feed.

Fraser's sunbird, Deleornis fraseriAnchieta's sunbird, Anthreptes anchietaeMouse-brown sunbird, Anthreptes gabonicusWestern violet-backed sunbird, Anthreptes longuemareiViolet-tailed sunbird, Anthreptes aurantiusLittle green sunbird, Anthreptes seimundiGreen sunbird, Anthreptes rectirostrisCollared sunbird, Hedydipna collarisReichenbach's sunbird, Anabathmis reichenbachiiGreen-headed sunbird, Cyanomitra verticalisBannerman's sunbird, Cyanomitra bannermaniBlue-throated brown sunbird, Cyanomitra cyanolaemaOlive sunbird, Cyanomitra olivaceaCarmelite sunbird, Chalcomitra fuliginosaGreen-throated sunbird, Chalcomitra rubescensAmethyst sunbird, Chalcomitra amethystinaScarlet-chested sunbird, Chalcomitra senegalensisBocage's sunbird, Nectarinia bocagiiBronze sunbird, Nectarinia kilimensisOlive-bellied sunbird, Cinnyris chloropygiusWestern Miombo sunbird, Cinnyris gertrudisEastern Miombo sunbird, Cinnyris manoensisMontane double-collared sunbird, Cinnyris ludovicensis 
Greater double-collared sunbird, Cinnyris aferMariqua sunbird, Cinnyris mariquensisShelley's sunbird, Cinnyris shelleyiPurple-banded sunbird, Cinnyris bifasciatusOrange-tufted sunbird, Cinnyris bouvieriSplendid sunbird, Cinnyris coccinigasterJohanna's sunbird, Cinnyris johannaeSuperb sunbird, Cinnyris superbusOustalet's sunbird, Cinnyris oustaletiWhite-breasted sunbird, Cinnyris talatalaVariable sunbird, Cinnyris venustusDusky sunbird, Cinnyris fuscusBates's sunbird, Cinnyris batesiCopper sunbird, Cinnyris cupreusWeavers and allies
Order: PasseriformesFamily: Ploceidae

The weavers are small passerine birds related to the finches. They are seed-eating birds with rounded conical bills. The males of many species are brightly coloured, usually in red or yellow and black, some species show variation in colour only in the breeding season.

Red-billed buffalo-weaver, Bubalornis nigerScaly weaver, Sporopipes squamifronsWhite-browed sparrow-weaver, Plocepasser mahaliChestnut-crowned sparrow-weaver, Plocepasser superciliosusChestnut-backed sparrow-weaver, Plocepasser rufoscapulatusSociable weaver, Philetairus sociusBlack-throated malimbe, Malimbus cassiniBlue-billed malimbe, Malimbus nitensCrested malimbe, Malimbus malimbicusRed-headed malimbe, Malimbus rubricollisRed-headed weaver, Anaplectes rubricepsBlack-chinned weaver, Ploceus nigrimentumSlender-billed weaver, Ploceus pelzelniLoango weaver, Ploceus subpersonatusBlack-necked weaver, Ploceus nigricollisSpectacled weaver, Ploceus ocularisBocage's weaver, Ploceus temporalisHolub's golden weaver, Ploceus xanthopsOrange weaver, Ploceus aurantiusSouthern brown-throated weaver, Ploceus xanthopterusLesser masked-weaver, Ploceus intermediusSouthern masked-weaver, Ploceus velatusVieillot's black weaver, Ploceus nigerrimusVillage weaver, Ploceus cucullatusChestnut weaver, Ploceus rubiginosusYellow-mantled weaver, Ploceus tricolorForest weaver, Ploceus bicolorBrown-capped weaver, Ploceus insignisPreuss's weaver, Ploceus preussiBar-winged weaver, Ploceus angolensisCompact weaver, Pachyphantes superciliosusRed-headed quelea, Quelea erythropsRed-billed quelea, Quelea queleaBob-tailed weaver, Brachycope anomala (A)
Southern red bishop, Euplectes orixBlack-winged bishop, Euplectes hordeaceusBlack bishop, Euplectes gierowiiYellow-crowned bishop, Euplectes aferGolden-backed bishop, Euplectes aureusYellow bishop, Euplectes capensisWhite-winged widowbird, Euplectes albonotatusYellow-mantled widowbird, Euplectes macrouraRed-collared widowbird, Euplectes ardensFan-tailed widowbird, Euplectes axillarisMarsh widowbird, Euplectes hartlaubiLong-tailed widowbird, Euplectes progneGrosbeak weaver, Amblyospiza albifronsWaxbills and allies
Order: PasseriformesFamily: Estrildidae

The estrildid finches are small passerine birds of the Old World tropics and Australasia. They are gregarious and often colonial seed eaters with short thick but pointed bills. They are all similar in structure and habits, but have wide variation in plumage colours and patterns.

Bronze mannikin, Spermestes cucullatusMagpie mannikin, Spermestes fringilloidesBlack-and-white mannikin, Spermestes bicolorWhite-collared oliveback, Nesocharis ansorgeiYellow-bellied waxbill, Coccopygia quartiniaAngola waxbill, Coccopygia bocagei (E)
Green-backed twinspot, Mandingoa nitidulaRed-faced crimsonwing, Cryptospiza reichenoviiWoodhouse's antpecker, Parmoptila woodhouseiWhite-breasted nigrita, Nigrita fusconotaChestnut-breasted nigrita, Nigrita bicolorGray-headed nigrita, Nigrita canicapillaPale-fronted nigrita, Nigrita luteifronsBlack-faced waxbill, Brunhilda erythronotosBlack-tailed waxbill, Glaucestrilda perreiniCinderella waxbill, Glaucestrilda thomensisBlack-headed waxbill, Estrilda atricapillaOrange-cheeked waxbill, Estrilda melpodaFawn-breasted waxbill, Estrilda paludicolaCommon waxbill, Estrilda astrildQuailfinch, Ortygospiza atricollisLocustfinch, Paludipasser locustellaCut-throat, Amadina fasciataRed-headed finch, Amadina erythrocephalaZebra waxbill, Amandava subflavaViolet-eared waxbill, Granatina granatinaSouthern cordonbleu, Uraeginthus angolensisRed-cheeked cordonbleu, Uraeginthus bengalusWestern bluebill, Spermophaga haematinaRed-headed bluebill, Spermophaga ruficapillaBlack-bellied seedcracker, Pyrenestes ostrinusGreen-winged pytilia, Pytilia melbaOrange-winged pytilia, Pytilia afraDusky twinspot, Euschistospiza cinereovinaceaPeters's twinspot, Hypargos niveoguttatusBrown twinspot, Clytospiza monteiriRed-billed firefinch, Lagonosticta senegalaAfrican firefinch, Lagonosticta rubricataJameson's firefinch, Lagonosticta rhodopareiaBrown firefinch, Lagonosticta nitidulaIndigobirds
Order: PasseriformesFamily: Viduidae

The indigobirds are finch-like species which usually have black or indigo predominating in their plumage. All are brood parasites, which lay their eggs in the nests of estrildid finches.

Pin-tailed whydah, Vidua macrouraBroad-tailed paradise-whydah, Vidua obtusaEastern paradise-whydah, Vidua paradisaeaShaft-tailed whydah, Vidua regiaVillage indigobird, Vidua chalybeataVariable indigobird, Vidua funereaPurple indigobird, Vidua purpurascensParasitic weaver, Anomalospiza imberbisOld World sparrows
Order: PasseriformesFamily: Passeridae

Old World sparrows are small passerine birds. In general, sparrows tend to be small, plump, brown or grey birds with short tails and short powerful beaks. Sparrows are seed eaters, but they also consume small insects.

House sparrow, Passer domesticusGreat rufous sparrow, Passer motitensisCape sparrow, Passer melanurusNorthern gray-headed sparrow, Passer griseusSouthern gray-headed sparrow, Passer diffususYellow-throated bush sparrow, Gymnoris superciliarisWagtails and pipits
Order: PasseriformesFamily: Motacillidae

Motacillidae is a family of small passerine birds with medium to long tails. They include the wagtails, longclaws and pipits. They are slender, ground feeding insectivores of open country.

Cape wagtail, Motacilla capensisMountain wagtail, Motacilla claraWestern yellow wagtail, Motacilla flavaAfrican pied wagtail, Motacilla aguimpWhite wagtail, Motacilla albaAfrican pipit, Anthus cinnamomeusWoodland pipit, Anthus nyassaeLong-billed pipit, Anthus similisNicholson's pipit, Anthus nicholsoniPlain-backed pipit, Anthus leucophrysBuffy pipit, Anthus vaalensisLong-legged pipit, Anthus pallidiventrisStriped pipit, Anthus lineiventrisTree pipit, Anthus trivialisShort-tailed pipit, Anthus brachyurusBush pipit, Anthus cafferYellow-throated longclaw, Macronyx croceusFülleborn's longclaw, Macronyx fuelleborniiRosy-throated longclaw, Macronyx ameliaeGrimwood's longclaw, Macronyx grimwoodiFinches, euphonias, and allies
Order: PasseriformesFamily: Fringillidae

Finches are seed-eating passerine birds, that are small to moderately large and have a strong beak, usually conical and in some species very large. All have twelve tail feathers and nine primaries. These birds have a bouncing flight with alternating bouts of flapping and gliding on closed wings, and most sing well.

Yellow-fronted canary, Crithagra mozambicusAfrican citril, Crithagra citrinelloidesWestern citril, Crithagra frontalisBlack-faced canary, Crithagra capistratusBlack-throated canary, Crithagra atrogularisBrimstone canary, Crithagra sulphuratusYellow canary, Crithagra flaviventrisWhite-throated canary, Crithagra albogularisThick-billed seedeater, Crithagra burtoniBlack-eared seedeater, Crithagra mennelliStreaky-headed seedeater, Crithagra gularisYellow-crowned canary, Serinus flavivertexOld World buntings
Order: PasseriformesFamily: Emberizidae

The emberizids are a large family of passerine birds. They are seed-eating birds with distinctively shaped bills.

Cabanis's bunting, Emberiza cabanisiGolden-breasted bunting, Emberiza flaviventrisCape bunting, Emberiza capensisLark-like bunting, Emberiza impetuaniCinnamon-breasted bunting, Emberiza tahapisi''

See also
List of birds
Lists of birds by region

References

External links
Birds of Angola - World Institute for Conservation and Environment

Angola
Angola
Birds
Angola